Ackley–Geneva Community School District was a school district headquartered in Ackley, Iowa, serving both Ackley and Geneva, Iowa.

On July 1, 2001, it merged with the Wellsburg-Steamboat Rock Community School District to form the AGWSR Community School District.

References

Defunct school districts in Iowa
Education in Franklin County, Iowa
Education in Hardin County, Iowa
2001 disestablishments in Iowa
Educational institutions disestablished in 2001